Transitional armour describes the armour used in Europe around the 14th century, as body armour moved from simple mail hauberks to full plate armour. 

The couter was added to the hauberk to better protect the elbows, and splinted armour and the coat of plates provided increased protection for other areas. 

Armourers in general began experimenting with various forms of rigid defense. They worked in a variety of materials, including wrought iron, latten, leather, cloth and even bone to substitute rigid materials for mail as the knight's harness progressed. Toward the end of the century and into the following one, updates to armour took place at an accelerated rate. 

The use of multiple materials is the key stylistic element of the period. For instance, a set of transitional style arm defenses could employ steel pauldrons, leather rerebraces, steel elbow cops and leather vambraces. These items would be strapped with leather and might have brass or bronze fittings and buckles. This use of varied materials gave the armour different coloring, textures and more elegant appearance.

Swordfighting re-enactors such as the Society for Creative Anachronisms wear personalized transitional armour for safety reasons, composed of a combination of thick leather, mail and plate armour.

Medieval armour
Western plate armour